Gordon Cowey (1 September 1930 – 27 March 1999) is an Australian rower. He competed in the men's coxed four event at the 1956 Summer Olympics.

References

1930 births
1999 deaths
Australian male rowers
Olympic rowers of Australia
Rowers at the 1956 Summer Olympics
Place of birth missing